Interlaken is a town in northwestern Wasatch County, Utah, United States. The current mayor is Greg Harrigan

Geography
The entire town is situated on the foothills in northwestern Heber Valley. It is surrounded on three sides (west, north, and east) by the Wasatch Mountain State Park. On the south is the city of Midway, which provides the only access to the town via either Canyon View Road (North 220 West) or Interlaken Drive (the latter of which was originally the only access road to Interlaken).

History
The community was began as a housing development in unincorporated Wasatch County that was known as Interlaken Estates. The town was officially incorporated on May 20, 2015.

Demographics

See also

 List of municipalities in Utah

References

External links

 

Towns in Utah
Towns in Wasatch County, Utah
Populated places established in 2015